Daniel Bewley (born 10 May 1999) is a British international speedway rider.

Career
Bewley started riding for the Belle Vue Colts and as a reserve for the Edinburgh Monarchs in 2017. In 2017, he won the National League Riders' Championship before being promoted to the senior side (Belle Vue Aces) in 2017. The same year he won the 2017 Conference League Riders' Championship.

In 2018, he finished runner-up to Robert Lambert in the British Speedway Championship, won the British Under-19 Final and claimed a third place in the second round of the World Under 21 Championship series in Poland.

In 2020, Bewley won the British Speedway Under 21 Championship and became a member of the British Speedway team. In 2021, he finished runner-up again in the 2021 British Speedway Championship.

In 2021, he became a world champion after Great Britain secured the 2021 Speedway of Nations (the world team title).

In August 2022, Bewley won back-to-back SGPs in Cardiff and Wroclaw. In September 2022, he became the British champion after winning the 2022 British Speedway Championship with a 15 point maximum from his five rides. Bewley ended the 2022 season with a sixth place finish during the 2022 Speedway World Championship, after securing 102 points during the 2022 Speedway Grand Prix. The top six place finish automatically qualified him for the 2023 Speedway Grand Prix. He helped Smederna win the Swedish Speedway Team Championship during the 2022 campaign.

In 2023, he returned to ride for Belle Vue for the SGB Premiership 2023.

Major results

World individual Championship
2022 Speedway Grand Prix - 6th including British & Polish Grand Prix wins

World team Championships
2020 Speedway of Nations - 6th
2021 Speedway of Nations - Winner
2022 Speedway of Nations - runner up

References 

1999 births
Living people
British speedway riders
Belle Vue Aces riders
Belle Vue Colts riders
Edinburgh Monarchs riders
Glasgow Tigers riders
Workington Comets riders
British Speedway Championship winners